Grimsby Town Football Club entered the 2006–07 season as a member of League Two for the 3rd season on the trot. The club was managed by new appointment Graham Rodger. The club is still aiming to leave Blundell Park within the next few seasons.

Fixtures and results

Friendlies

Lincolnshire Cup

Football League Two

FA Cup

League Cup

Football League Trophy

League table
The four teams relegated from League One in 2005–06 would occupy the top four this season, sending Walsall, Hartlepool and Swindon back up. Bristol Rovers won the play-offs however, returning to League One after six years.

Torquay United had been both the last team to finish bottom under the old election system, and the last team to finish bottom of the League and survive due to the Conference champions not having a good enough ground. However, this season they finished bottom and dropped out of the League. They were joined by Boston United, who went into administration in the 87th minute of the season's final game (but would still have been relegated even without the 10-point administration penalty).

Coaching staff

First Team squad

Squad overview

Appearances and goals

|}

Loaned out player stats

|}

Most frequent starting line-up

Most frequent starting line-up uses the team's most used formation: 4–4–2. The players used are those who have played the most games in each respective position, not necessarily who have played most games out of all the players.

Transfers

In

Pre-season

Mid-season

Out

Pre-season

Mid-season

References 

Grimsby Town F.C. seasons
Grimsby Town